This is a list of football clubs in Jamaica.

All information is taken from the rsssf.com database for the 2006/2007 season.

Jamaica Premier League

Jamaica Premier League 2021/2022

Arnett Gardens F.C.
Cavaliers F.C.
Dunbeholden F.C.
Harbour View F.C.
Humble Lions F.C.
Molynes United F.C.
Montego Bay United F.C.
Mount Pleasant Football Academy
Portmore United F.C.
Tivoli Gardens F.C.
Vere United F.C.
Waterhouse F.C.

Parish Confederations Super Leagues

KSAFA Confederation Super League

Barbican F.C.
Boys' Town F.C.
Brown’s Town F.C.
Central Kingston F.C.
Constant Spring F.C.
Liguanea United F.C. 
Meadforest F.C.
Olympic Gardens F.C.
Real Moan fc
Rockforth F.C.
Santos F.C.
Seaview gardens F.C.

South Central Confederation Super League

Arlington F.C.
Dunbeholden F.C.
George's Valley F.C.
Humble Lions F.C.
Los Perfectos F.C.
New Green F.C.
Newland F.C.
Original Hazard F.C.
Rivoli United F.C.
Sporting Central F.C. (winners)
Tafari Lions F.C.
Value Pare F.C. (withdrew due to a conflict with the Confederation)

Eastern Confederation Super League
(Albion Fc)
Axum F.C.
Bath F.C.
Brazil F.C.
Iyante F.C.
Manchioneal F.C.
Port Morant F.C.
Star Cosmos F.C.
St. George's F.C. 
York F.C. ( champion of the east)

Western Confederation Super League

Bamboo F.C.
Black Diamonds F.C.
Clarks Town F.C.
Grange Hill F.C.
Granville F.C. (winners)
Harmony F.C.
Holland F.C.
Montpellier F.C.
Mount Salem F.C.
Negril F.C.
Orange Hill F.C.
Salt Spring F.C.
Sandy Bay F.C.

Third Level

KSAFA Major League

Brown's Town F.C.
Central Kingston F.C.
Cooreville Gardens F.C.
Elleston Flats F.C.
Olympic Gardens F.C.
Pembroke Hall F.C.
Rae Town F.C.
Real Mona F.C.
Rockfort F.C.
Seaview Gardens F.C.
Shortwood United F.C.
UTech/Papine F.C.
New Kingston F.C.

Clarendon Major League

Avengers F.C.
Gayle F.C.
Mitchell Town F.C.
Morgan's Pass F.C.
Name Brand F.C.
New Bowens F.C.
New Longsville F.C.
Springfield F.C.
Tollgate F.C.
Wood Hall F.C.
Race Track F.C.

Hanover Major League

Lucea F.C.
Logwood United F.C.
Logwood Galaxy F.C.
Central F.C.
Chamber Pen F.C.
COGP F.C.
Concrete F.C.
Excel F.C.
Haddington F.C.
Lookout F.C.
Prosper F.C.
Superstar F.C.

Manchester Major League

Downs F.C.
Harmons F.C.
Hillstar F.C.
Kendal F.C.
Mandeville United F.C.
Mile Gully F.C.
Porus F.C.
Villa United

Portland Major League

Eagle Strikers F.C.
Fairy Hill F.C.
Norwich F.C.
Progressive F.C.(JUNGLES)
Snow Hill F.C.
Taurus F.C.

St. Ann Major League

Benfica F.C.
DC United F.C.
FC Ocho Rios
Golden Kickers F.C.
Great Pond F.C.
Juventus F.C.
Lewis Strikers F.C.
Parry Town F.C.
Raising Star F.C.
St. Ann Bauxite F.C.
Standfast F.C.
Volvo F.C.
York Castle High F.C.
Chalky Hill United F.C.
Steer Town F.C

St. Catherine Major League

Albion F.C.
Black Lions F.C.
Bodles F.C.
Central Links F.C.
Independence City F.C.
Meadows F.C.
McKay New Raiders F.C.
Portmore Gardens F.C.
Rodwood F.C.
Tru Juice F.C.
Waterloo F.C.
Windsor Lion F.C.
Royal Lakes F.C.
Money pro F.C.

St. Elizabeth Major League

Appleton Estate F.C.
Balaclava United F.C.
Black River F.C.
Epping Forest F.C.
Haughton United F.C.
Holland Police Youth Club F.C.
Middle Quarters F.C.
New River United F.C.
Rasta Camp F.C.
STETHS F.C.
Super Action F.C.
Young Brazil F.C.

St. James Major League
Cambridge United F.C.
Altobar F.C.
Catherine Hall F.C.
Champions F.C.
Fogo United F.C.
Juniors F.C.
Maldon F.C.
Melbourne F.C.
Montego Bay Boys' Club F.C.
Mountain Villa F.C.
Reggae Lions F.C.
Seba United Youths F.C.
Tomorrow's People F.C.
Violet Kickers F.C.
Salt spring F.C.
Seaview F.C.

St. Mary Major League

Albany F.C.
Albion Mountain F.C.
Enfield F.C.
Four Five F.C.
Frazerwood F.C.
Hard Hitters F.C.
Rangers "A" F.C.
Yellow Stars F.C.

St. Thomas Major League

Paul Bogle F.C.
Danvers Pen F.C.
Delta Force F.C.
Kool Kat F.C.
Leith Hall F.C.
Lyssons United F.C.
Prospect F.C.
Real Morant F.C.
White Horses Upliftment F.C.
Yallahs United F.C.

Trelawny Major League

Brits United F.C.
Daniel Town FC 
Duanvale F.C.
Flames F.C.
Harmony F.C.
Kinloss F.C.
Invaders United F.C. (withdrew due to severe financial constraints)
Lacers F.C.
Preston United F.C.
Spicy Hill F.C.
Studs United F.C.
Unity F.C.
Upsetters F.C.

Westmoreland Major League

Central Communities F.C.
Chantilly F.C.
Frome F.C.
Mount Grace F.C.
New Market Oval F.C.
Paul Island F.C.
Petersfield F.C.
Roaring River F.C.
Robins River F.C.
Russia F.C.
Straths F.C.
Three Miles River F.C.

Fourth Level

KSAFA Syd Bartlett League

Allman/Woodford F.C.
Gordon Town F.C.
Island Special Constabulary Force F.C.
Liguanea F.C.
Maxfield Park F.C.
Meadforest F.C.
New Kingston F.C.
Port Royal F.C.
Swallowfield F.C.
University of the West Indies F.C.
Whitfield Town F.C.

St. Catherine Division One

Braeton F.C.
Cumberland F.C.
Flamingo F.C.
Hopeview F.C.
McCook's Pen F.C.
National Irrigation F.C.
Old Harbour Bay Allstars F.C.
Passagefort F.C.
Police F.C.
Southborough F.C.
Spring Village F.C.
Travellers F.C.

Fifth Level

Portmore Division Two

Caymanas Garden F.C.
Christian Pen F.C.
Daytona F.C.
East Portmore Portals F.C.
Greater Portmore F.C.
Hellshire United F.C.
Newtown Braeton F.C.
Passagefort F.C.
Portmore Pines F.C.
Portsmouth F.C.
Waterford F.C.
Watson Grove F.C.
Bleachers F.C.

External links
National Premier League 2006/2007
Second Level Super Leagues 2006/2007
Third Level Leagues 2006/2007
Fourth Level and lower Leagues 2006/2007

Jamaica
Football clubs
 
Football clubs